The Greatest Story Ever Told is the fifth studio album by American rapper and record producer David Banner. The album was released on July 15, 2008, by Universal Motown and SRC Records. The first single from the album is called "Speaker", better known by its explicit title "9mm". It features  Snoop Dogg, Lil Wayne and Akon. The track was produced by Akon. The second single is "Get Like Me", which features Chris Brown and Yung Joc. The third single is "Shawty Say", which features Lil Wayne and samples Lollipop. The music video premiered on FNMTV on August 1, 2008.

The album features guest appearances from Akon, Lil Wayne, Snoop Dogg, Chris Brown, UGK, Yung Joc, Chamillionaire, Carl Thomas, Jim Jones, and more. In addition to rapping, Banner will also be among his own list of producers, joining Nitti, Get Cool 3000, Warryn Campbell, Deezle and Cool and Dre, who also produced two tracks for the album, entitled "A Girl" and "Point 'Em To The Door." Banner put three instrumental tracks on his album. During an appearance on 106 & Park, he confirmed that this was to help up-and-coming artists by letting them rap on the beats after purchasing the album.

Commercial performance
The album debuted on number eight on the U.S. Billboard 200 chart, selling 51,800 copies in its first week.

Track listing

Charts

Weekly charts

Year-end charts

References

2008 albums
David Banner albums
Albums produced by Cool & Dre
Albums produced by David Banner
Albums produced by Warryn Campbell